Greppi is an Italian surname. Notable people with the surname include:

Antonio Greppi (1894–1982), Italian writer, politician and dramaturge
Antonio Greppi (1722–1799), Italian banker, merchant, politician and diplomat
Cristoforo Greppi, Italian Mannerist painter
Emanuele Greppi (1853–1931), Italian lawyer and politician
 Giovanni Greppi (1884-1960), architect 
Giovanni Greppi (born 1910), Italian footballer
Milena Greppi (1929-2016), Italian hurdler

Italian-language surnames